Odysseus Abroad is a 2014 novel written by Amit Chaudhuri.
The Odysseus of the title is a young Bengali studying English literature at an unnamed university in London.
A review of the book in The New Yorker commented that "there is no obvious plot, no determined design, no faked "conflict" or other drama. The two men just go walking in North London."

References

2014 British novels
Books by Indian authors
Hamish Hamilton books
Novels set in London